Francis Briggs Sowter (died 10 September 1928) was  Archdeacon of Dorset from 1889 to 1901.

Biography
Born in 1852, he was educated at Corpus Christi College, Cambridge, and ordained in 1876. After a curacy at Kegworth he held incumbencies in Corscombe,  Weymouth, Fleet and Dorchester. He was appointed Archdeacon of Dorset in 1889, serving as such until his resignation due to ill-health in December 1901. He was later appointed Canon.

Sowter died on 10 September 1928.

Notes

1852 births
Alumni of Corpus Christi College, Cambridge
Archdeacons of Dorset
1928 deaths